Woman's Missionary Union (WMU) is an auxiliary of the Southern Baptist Convention that was founded in 1888.  It is the largest Protestant missions organization for women in the world.

History

Origins

During the meeting of the Southern Baptist Convention in Richmond, Virginia, in May 1888, a group of women delegates from 12 states gathered at the Broad Street United Methodist Church and organized the Executive Committee of the Woman's Mission Societies, Auxiliary to Southern Baptist Convention.

In previous years, women had been meeting during the convention to discuss the possibilities of creating a missions organization. During the 1888 meeting, a constitution was adopted and the first officers were elected. Baltimore, Maryland, was chosen as headquarters.

Fannie E.S. Heck led the Woman's Missionary Union after 1892 for about 15 years.

The dominant personality was Lottie Moon (1840–1912) who spent nearly 40 years (1873–1912) living and working in China. She was an early feminist pioneer for women's equality, but her reputation in Baptist memory is one of a Southern belle who followed traditional gender roles. Her memory is used in the Union's main annual fundraising drive.

Baltimore years
 
Annie Armstrong, elected as the first corresponding secretary during the organizational meeting, lived in Baltimore. WMU was originally established and remains an auxiliary to the Southern Baptist Convention, which means that it acts as a "helper" to the SBC. The auxiliary status also means that WMU is self-governing and self-supporting.

Prior to this meeting, women had been gathering to pray for missions under the leadership of women such as Ann Baker Graves. In 1871, Baptist women in Baltimore founded Woman's Mission to Woman for the purpose of prayer and dissemination of information about missionaries. Maryland Baptist women began publishing and distributing missions literature in 1887. Although many southern states had a missions organization for women, there was no central body to provide unity or coordinate efforts. The time had come for the women to organize and the founding mothers of WMU established an organization that has been supporting Baptist missions for over a century. WMU has been blessed with the leadership of seven magnificent corresponding secretaries/executive directors (Wanda Lee serves currently) and seventeen presidents (Kaye Miller serves currently).

Name change
In 1890 the women adopted the name Woman's Missionary Union, Auxiliary to Southern Baptist Convention. The headquarters of WMU was originally stationed in the Maryland Baptist Missions Reading Room where Annie Armstrong had an already established office.

Move to Birmingham
In 1921, the national headquarters was moved to Birmingham, Alabama under the guidance of Kathleen Mallory to 1111 Comer Building.  As WMU grew into its own, space began to be a problem at the national headquarters. In 1951, WMU purchased property at 600 20th Street North in downtown Birmingham. It was during these years that WMU membership reached an all-time high of 1.5 million women under the dynamic leadership of Alma Hunt, who served as executive secretary from 1948 to 1974.

Reorganization
The 1970s brought changes to the organizations of WMU. In October of that year, WMS, YWA, Girls' Auxiliary, and Sunbeams were changed to Baptist Women (BW), Baptist Young Women (BYW), Acteens, Girls in Action (GA), and Mission Friends.

Change in publications followed as Contempo, Accent, Discovery, Aware, and Dimension were introduced into the WMU publications family.

New headquarters
In 1984, the national headquarters moved once again to New Hope Mountain on U.S. Highway 280, just outside the Birmingham city limits.

In 1985, New Hope was created for the publication of products designed to reach a wider audience. In 1995, more changes were made to the WMU organizations and magazine publications. Baptist Women and Baptist Young Women were included in a new organization called Women on Mission.

At this time, Royal Service magazine was replaced by Missions Mosaic. Three new mission organizations were introduced in 1995 as well: Adults on Mission, Youth on Mission, and Children in Action.

WMU today
Since its beginning in 1888, WMU has become the largest Protestant missions organization for women in the world, with a membership of approximately 1 million. WMU's main purpose is to educate and involve adults, youth, children, and preschoolers in the cause of Christian missions. Although originally geared towards women, girls, and preschoolers, both genders are active participants in WMU organizations and ministries today. These ministries are: Baptist Nursing FellowshipSM, Christian Women's Job Corps, International InitiativesSM, Missionary Housing, Project HELPSM, Pure Water, Pure LoveSM, Volunteer ConnectionSM, and WorldCraftsSM.

Purpose
WMU "seeks to equip adults, youth, children and preschoolers with missions education to become radically involved in the mission of God. Headquartered in Birmingham, Ala., WMU is a nonprofit organization that offers an array of missions resources including conferences, ministry ideas and models, volunteer opportunities, curriculum for age-level organizations, leadership training, books and more."

Organizations, opportunities, and resources
WMU provides missions education organizations for all ages:
 Women on Mission, for women 18 and up
 Adults on Mission, for men and women 18 and up
 Acteens, for girls grades 7-12
 Youth on Mission, for boys and girls grades 7-12
 Girls in Action (GA), for girls grades 1-6
 Royal Ambassadors, for boys grades 1-6
 Children in Action, for boys and girls grades 1-6
 Mission Friends, for preschool girls and boys birth through kindergarten

WMU also provides a variety of missions opportunities and resources:
Baptist Nursing Fellowship, an organization which encourages health-care service stemming from a personal commitment to Jesus Christ
Christian Women's Job Corps and Christian Men's Job Corps, ministries that help equip women and men in need for life and employment
International Initiatives, which addresses issues facing women and children through international partnerships
Missionary housing, providing short-term housing for international missionaries
Missions Interchange, a missions website for collegiate women
my MISSION fulfilled, a missions website for young adult women
New Hope Publishers, a Christian publisher that challenges Christian believers to understand and be radically involved in the mission of God
Project HELP, a two-year emphasis which addresses a selected social issue
Pure Water, Pure Love, which provides clean drinking water for missionaries and the people they serve
Volunteer Connection, a network that matches volunteers with missions needs, and includes Missions FEST and Family FEST mission trips
WMU Store, a wealth of Christian missions resources, including missions idea books for any church
WorldCrafts, a ministry that supports artisans around the world through selling fairly traded, handmade items

See also
 Women's missionary societies

References

Further reading
 Hunt, Alma. Woman's Missionary Union (1964) Online free

External links
 Woman's Missionary Union (SBC)

Religious organizations established in 1888
Southern Baptist Convention
Christian missions in China
Baptist organizations established in the 19th century
Baptist missionary societies
History of women in Alabama